Jared Gordon (born September 6, 1988) is an American mixed martial artist. He was the lightweight champion of Duelo De Gigantes in Mexico and featherweight champion for Cage Fury Fighting Championships in United States. He competes in the lightweight division of the Ultimate Fighting Championship (UFC).

Background

Gordon was born and raised in Queens, New York. The grandson of late professional boxer Sal Ferello, Gordon started boxing and wrestling at a young age and he was obsessed with MMA when he was in high school. He found an MMA school, Combined MMA, and started training BJJ. Gordon spent most of his adolescence in Westport CT attending Staples High School. In his time in Westport Gordon learned valuable skills from his uncle Oliver Barkley. Four months later, at age of 17, Gordon fought his first amateur MMA fight. He taught boxing and Muay Thai at Church Street Boxing in New York prior to turning professional. At the same gym he was trained by Jason Slow.

Gordon is in long-term recovery from chaotic drug use and would like to use the octagon as the platform to voice his support and give hope to those  who suffer the same addiction.

Mixed martial arts career

Early career 
Gordon amassed a record of 12–1 prior joining UFC. He was the lightweight champion of Duelo De Giagantes in Mexico and featherweight champion for Cage Fury Fighting Championship in United States.

Ultimate Fighting Championship
Gordon was scouted by Dana White on UFC web series show "Dana White: Looking for a fight" second season episode two at Cage Fury Fighting Championships where Gordon won the Featherweight title that night. White was impressed with his performance and signed him onto UFC.

Gordon was scheduled his promotional debut to face Michel Quiñones at UFC 211. However, Gordon pulled out of the fight on the day before the event due to stomach illness and the bout was rescheduled to June 25, 2017 at UFC Fight Night: Chiesa vs. Lee in Oklahoma City. At the weigh-in, Gordon missed the required featherweight limit for the fight of 146Ibs. As a result he was fined 20% of his pay, and the bouts proceeded at catchweight. Gordon secured his first UFC win on round two via TKO.

Gordon faced Hacran Dias at the lightweight bout on October 28, 2017 at UFC Fight Night: Brunson vs. Machida. He won the fight via unanimous decision.

Gordon faced Carlos Diego Ferreira on February 18, 2018 at UFC Fight Night: Cowboy vs. Medeiros. He lost the fight via TKO in the first round. After the loss, Gordon decided to move to Milwaukee to train at Roufusport under Duke Roufus.

Gordon faced Joaquim Silva on December 15, 2018 at UFC on Fox 31. He lost the fight via knockout in round three. This fight earned him the Fight of the Night award. Despite losing the two last fights of his rookie contract, he signed a new four-fight contract with the UFC after the Silva fight.

Gordon faced Dan Moret on June 29, 2019 at UFC on ESPN 3. He won the fight via unanimous decision.

Gordon was expected to face Leonardo Santos on November 16, 2019 at UFC Fight Night 164. However, Santos withdrew from the fight and was replaced by Charles Oliveira. He lost the fight via knockout in the first round.

Gordon was scheduled to face Matt Sayles on May 16, 2020. However, on April 9, Dana White, the president of UFC announced that this event was postponed to a future date due to COVID-19 pandemic.

Gordon faced Chris Fishgold in a featherweight bout on July 16, 2020 at UFC on ESPN: Kattar vs. Ige.  At the weigh-ins, Fishgold weighed in at 149 pounds, 3 pounds over the featherweight non-title fight limit. He was fined 20% of he purse which went to Gordon and their bout proceeded at catchweight. Gordon won the fight via unanimous decision. With one fight left on his contract, Gordon subsequently signed a new contract with the UFC.

Gordon faced Danny Chavez on February 20, 2021 at UFC Fight Night 185. At the weigh-ins, Gorden weighed in at 150 pounds, four pounds over the featherweight non-title fight limit. He was fined 30%  of his purse which went to his opponent Chavez and the bout  proceed at catchweight. Gordon won the fight via unanimous decision.

Gordon faced Joe Solecki on October 2, 2021 at UFC Fight Night 193. He won the fight via split decision.

Gordon was scheduled to face Rafael Alves on April 30, 2022 at UFC on ESPN 35. However Alves withdrew from the event for undisclosed reasons and he was replace by Grant Dawson. He lost the bout via rear-naked choke late into the third round.

Gordon faced Leonardo Santos on August 20, 2022 at UFC 278. He won the bout via unanimous decision.

Gordon faced Paddy Pimblett on December 10, 2022, at UFC 282. He lost the bout via unanimous decision. The decision was seen as controversial, as many media outlets, fighters, and fans expressed their belief that Gordon had won the fight. 23 out of 24 media sources scored the fight in his favor.

Gordon is scheduled to face Bobby Green on April 22, 2023, at UFC Fight Night 222.

Personal life

Drug addiction 
Gordon used prescription pain medication to manage his pain from an injury and led him to drug addiction at the age of 19 and by 21 he was addicted to heroin. At 23, he was homeless and panhandling in the streets to support his drug habit. At some point, Gordon managed to get into a rehab program and became clean. He returned to fighting soon after. His fight against Jeff Lentz ended with Gordon suffering a broken orbital bone in five places. Due to this injury, he was given pain medication to help him deal with his injured eye and he became addicted, ultimately leading to an overdose incident.  Gordon managed to beat his drug addiction and stay sober by checking himself in rehab after the third overdose in his life in 2015 left him legally dead for two minutes. He is now in long-term recovery from problem drug use.

Championships and accomplishments

Mixed martial arts
Ultimate Fighting Championship
Fight of the Night (One time) 
Duelo De Giagantes
Duelo De Giagantes Lightweight Champion (One time) vs. Alejandro Roman
Cage Fury Fighting Championships
CFFC Featherweight Championship (One time) vs. Bill Algeo

Mixed martial arts record

|- 
|Loss
|align=center|19–6
|Paddy Pimblett
|Decision (unanimous)
|UFC 282
|
|align=center|3
|align=center|5:00
|Las Vegas, Nevada, United States
|
|-
|Win
|align=center|19–5
|Leonardo Santos
|Decision (unanimous)
|UFC 278
|
|align=center|3
|align=center|5:00
|Salt Lake City, Utah, United States
|
|-
|Loss
|align=center|18–5
|Grant Dawson
|Submission (rear-naked choke)
|UFC on ESPN: Font vs. Vera
|
|align=center|3
|align=center|4:11
|Las Vegas, Nevada, United States
|
|-
|Win
|align=center|18–4
|Joe Solecki
|Decision (split)
|UFC Fight Night: Santos vs. Walker
|
|align=center|3
|align=center|5:00
|Las Vegas, Nevada, United States
|
|-
|Win
|align=center|17–4
|Danny Chavez
|Decision (unanimous)
|UFC Fight Night: Blaydes vs. Lewis 
|
|align=center|3
|align=center|5:00
|Las Vegas, Nevada, United States
| 
|- 
|Win
|align=center|16–4
|Chris Fishgold
|Decision (unanimous)
|UFC on ESPN: Kattar vs. Ige 
|
|align=center|3
|align=center|5:00
|Abu Dhabi, United Arab Emirates
|
|-
|Loss
|align=center|15–4
|Charles Oliveira
|KO (punches)
|UFC Fight Night: Błachowicz vs. Jacaré 
|
|align=center|1
|align=center|1:26
|São Paulo, Brazil
|
|-
|Win
|align=center|15–3
|Dan Moret
|Decision (unanimous)
|UFC on ESPN: Ngannou vs. dos Santos 
|
|align=center|3
|align=center|5:00
|Minneapolis, Minnesota, United States
|
|-
|Loss
|align=center|14–3
|Joaquim Silva
|KO (punches)
|UFC on Fox: Lee vs. Iaquinta 2
|
|align=center|3
|align=center|2:39
|Milwaukee, Wisconsin, United States
|
|-
|Loss
|align=center|14–2
|Carlos Diego Ferreira
|TKO (punches)
|UFC Fight Night: Cowboy vs. Medeiros 
|
|align=center|1
|align=center|1:58
|Austin, Texas, United States
|
|-
| Win
|align=center| 14–1
|Hacran Dias
| Decision (unanimous)
|UFC Fight Night: Brunson vs. Machida
|
|align=center|3
|align=center|5:00
|São Paulo, Brazil
|
|-
| Win
| align=center| 13–1
| Michel Quiñones
| TKO (punches)
| UFC Fight Night: Chiesa vs. Lee
| 
| align=center| 2
| align=center| 4:24
| Oklahoma City, Oklahoma, United States
| 
|-
| Win
| align=center| 12–1
| Bill Algeo
| Decision (unanimous)
| CFFC 63
| 
| align=center| 4
| align=center| 5:00
| Atlantic City, New Jersey, United States
|
|-
| Win
| align=center| 11–1
| Dawond Pickney
| Submission (rear-naked choke)
| CFFC 60
| 
| align=center| 2
| align=center| 3:10
| Atlantic City, New Jersey, United States
|
|-
| Win
| align=center| 10–1
| Anthony Morrison
| KO (head kick)
| CFFC 59
| 
| align=center| 1
| align=center| 1:48
| Philadelphia, Pennsylvania, United States
|
|-
| Loss
| align=center| 9–1
| Jeff Lentz
| TKO (doctor stoppage)
| CFFC 48
| 
| align=center| 3
| align=center| 5:00
| Atlantic City, New Jersey, United States
|
|-
| Win
| align=center| 9–0
| Jay Coleman
| TKO (punches)
| CFFC 45
| 
| align=center| 1
| align=center| 4:47
| Atlantic City, New Jersey, United States
|
|-
| Win
| align=center| 8–0
| Corey Bleaken
| Decision (unanimous)
| CFFC 44
| 
| align=center| 3
| align=center| 5:00
| Bethlehem, Pennsylvania, United States
|
|-
| Win
| align=center| 7–0
| Johnson Jajoute
| Decision (unanimous)
| CFFC 28
| 
| align=center| 3
| align=center| 5:00
| Atlantic City, New Jersey, United States
|
|-
| Win
| align=center| 6–0
| Alejandro Roman
| Decision (unanimous)
| Duelo De Gigantes: Round 4
| 
| align=center| 5
| align=center| 5:00
| Zumpango, Mexico
|
|-
| Win
| align=center| 5–0
| Luiz Gustavo Felix dos Santos
| Decision (unanimous)
| Duelo De Gigantes: Round 3
| 
| align=center| 3
| align=center| 5:00
| Zumpango, Mexico
|
|-
| Win
| align=center| 4–0
| Oscar De La Parra
| TKO (punches)
| Duelo De Gigantes: Round 2
| 
| align=center| 3
| align=center| 2:14
| Zumpango, Mexico
|
|-
| Win
| align=center| 3–0
| Alvaro Enriquez
| TKO (punches)
| Duelo De Gigantes: Round 1
| 
| align=center| 2
| align=center| 4:25
| Mexico City, Mexico
|
|-
| Win
| align=center| 2–0
| Robert Fabrizi
| TKO (punches)
| CFFC 19
| 
| align=center| 2
| align=center| 2:31
| Atlantic City, New Jersey, United States
|
|-
| Win
| align=center| 1–0
| Anthony D'Agostino
| Submission (rear-naked choke)
| CFFC 6
| 
| align=center| 2
| align=center| 1:42
| Atlantic City, New Jersey, United States
|
|-

See also
List of current UFC fighters
List of male mixed martial artists
Cage Fury Fighting Championships

References

External links
 
 

Living people
1988 births
American male mixed martial artists
Lightweight mixed martial artists
Mixed martial artists utilizing wrestling
Mixed martial artists utilizing boxing
Mixed martial artists utilizing Muay Thai
Mixed martial artists utilizing Brazilian jiu-jitsu
Mixed martial artists from New York (state)
Ultimate Fighting Championship male fighters
American practitioners of Brazilian jiu-jitsu
American Muay Thai practitioners